Jonas Salisbury House may refer to:

 Jonas Salisbury House (62 Walnut Park), Newton, Massachusetts, listed on the NRHP in Middlesex County, Massachusetts
 Jonas Salisbury House (85 Langley Road), Newton, Massachusetts, listed on the NRHP in Middlesex County, Massachusetts